The 2000 Vuelta a Andalucía was the 46th edition of the Vuelta a Andalucía (Ruta del Sol) cycle race and was held on 13 February to 17 February 2000. The race started in Almería and finished in Granada. The race was won by Miguel Ángel Peña.

Teams
Nineteen teams of up to eight riders started the race:

 
 
 
 
 
 
 
 
 
 
 
 
 
 Palmans–Ideal
 
 Nürnberger

General classification

References

Vuelta a Andalucia
Vuelta a Andalucía by year
2000 in Spanish sport